Fade to Black is a 1995 action-adventure game developed by Delphine Software International and published by Electronic Arts Studios. It is the sequel to the 1992 video game Flashback. The game was released for MS-DOS with full Gouraud-shaded 3D graphics, and PlayStation with fully textured 3D. A version for the Dreamcast was released in 2018 by JoshProd, rebranded as Fade to Black: Flashback 2.

Gameplay

Fade to Black is a 3D action-adventure game with a third-person perspective from behind the character's back. It features gun combat with almost no platforming sequences.

Plot

The main protagonist is Conrad Hart who, in Flashback, destroyed the planet of hostile aliens called the Morphs and went into suspended animation in a spaceship that floats aimlessly through outer space. In the year 2190 (50 years later), he is found by the Morphs and imprisoned in the Lunar prison of New Alcatraz. There, he is rescued by a man who introduces himself as John O'Conner, who tells him that the Morphs beat him to Conrad's ship, and leaves Conrad a few items "of interest" (a PDA and a handgun), before destroying the camera. On the PDA is a message from John, who tells Conrad to sneak around the base. Mandragore agents left a radar scrambler there. Conrad soon makes it to John's ship. As they blast off, Morph ships start attacking them. They teleport to Mandragore base Shadow just as the ship is destroyed.

They meet Sarah Smith, the leader of the Mandragore resistance. Later, in a meeting with Mandragore commander Hank, she tells Conrad that while he was in suspended animation the Morphs attacked Earth with superior forces, which made the governments surrender. The Mandragore has far fewer people, but they refuse to give up. Agents then call Sarah and tell her that they have found the location of Professor Bergstein: Morph asteroid base D321. Sarah sends Conrad and John there to rescue him. Conrad eventually finds Bergstein, who tells him that the base must be destroyed because it contains the Morph's new mind-manipulating weapon. He gives him a datacube (similar to the holocube that is in Flashback), which he explains contains a virus that he programmed in. The virus will blow up the base when the datacube is connected to the core. They connect the virus to the core and escape the base with John as it blows up, along with the asteroid itself.

Conrad is then sent to a mining facility on Mars and gets the coordinates to a Morph base, where he rescues and meets Ageer. He tells Ageer about his previous adventures. Ageer tells Conrad that he and his people, an ancient alien race referred to as the "Ancients", want to join the Mandragore and can lead them to victory. Soon, Ageer tells Conrad that he must find the oracle in Pluto, the homeland of the Ancients. Conrad travels to Pluto with Ageer, who then tells Conrad that the oracle will lead him to the pyramid. As he travels, he finds a glass eyeball that he gives to a hand creature that then gives him the oracle. The oracle does lead Conrad to the pyramid, which Ageer uses to give the history of the Ancients to Conrad: "The Ancients live in peace until the Morphs arrive. The Ancients think that they come in peace and they welcome them. However, the Morphs attack the ancients. The Ancients put their souls in the pyramid, which is then captured by the Morphs."

The Morphs stole the pyramid and a new and apparently invincible creature, the Super Morph, arrives to kill Conrad. After avoiding him, he is teleported by Ageer to a Morph base in which he makes through looking for the stolen pyramid. In the meantime, he sees John telling Master Brain that their plan has become a success; with his identity, he has managed to infiltrate Shadow and put in an active detonation device. Master Brain tells John that someone is spying on them. John looks back, sees Conrad, and then transforms into his true identity: the Super Morph. After avoiding him, Conrad quickly takes the pyramid with a Morph ship and returns to Shadow, which is then attacked by the Morphs. Conrad fights his way through the Morphs as agents get killed. Conrad gets a key from a rescued soldier, which gives him access to the command room, where Conrad meets Hank. He tells Conrad that Sarah can give him the code to disable the detonation device, but she has been taken hostage by a Morph. Conrad gets to the floor and saves Sarah, who then gives him the code and teleports away.

After Conrad disables the device, Ageer and Hank enter the command room as Sarah explains their new plan. The Ancients have given the Mandragore the ability to know where the Master Brain controlling the solar system is on Easter Island in planet Earth. She and Conrad will teleport there and destroy it. As they arrive, they separate. Conrad eventually teleports to the Master Brain and throws the pyramid in front of it. As he then teleports away, the pyramid fights and defeats the Master Brain. As Conrad flees Easter Island, it starts exploding, and the Super Morph gives chase. From here there are two endings:

 If Conrad reunites with Sarah and goes to the ship, they enter it and Sarah begins starting its engines. The Super Morph attempts to attack, but Sarah pulls down on a control stick, directing the jet blast of one of the engines upon the Super Morph, killing it. Sarah then skillfully pilots the ship off Easter Island just as it explodes. As the ship rendezvous with a fleet of other vessels, Hank, on behalf of the Mandragore, transmits his congratulations and appreciation to Conrad on his efforts in destroying the Morphs. As Sarah pilots the ship into hyperdrive back to Shadow headquarters, a voice-over of Conrad is heard explaining that he was no longer alone. He speaks of the ships behind him, consisting of people on their way to Earth in a homecoming upon the defeat of the Morph menace after many decades of trying exile. Conrad, confidently declaring that no one would ever be alone again, anxiously rejoins his comrades of the Mandragore at Shadow headquarters.
 If Conrad gets to the ship alone, then he does the exact things that Sarah does in the other ending, including killing the Super Morph. However, he must fly off of Easter Island on his own. He successfully does just as Easter Island explodes. Hank seems unaware of Sarah's death as he does not mention it when he transmits his congratulations to Conrad. Although ships are converging on Earth and the Morphs have been destroyed, Conrad's future relationship with the Mandragore is left unknown.

Development
The idea of doing a 3D sequel to Flashback started in 1993. The game was originally announced under the title "Crossfire".

Conrad's animations were created using motion capture.

Reception

The PlayStation version was a best-seller in the United Kingdom, where it was among the nineteen best-selling PlayStation games of 1996 according to HMV. It sold enough copies to go Platinum.

Fade to Black received a moderately positive critical response. Electronic Gaming Monthly gave the PlayStation version their "Game of the Month" award. Reviewers generally criticized the game's steep difficulty and blocky polygon models, but praised the background graphics and animations, and generally concluded that the game's close blend of action and puzzling in a 3D environment was a success.

Fade to Black was named the 29th best computer game ever by PC Gamer UK in 1997. The editors called it "an adrenaline-pumping polygon adventure" and "an intriguing game". In 1996, GamesMaster ranked the Playstation version 50th on their "Top 100 Games of All Time."

Cancelled sequel
Flashback Legend was an unfinished second sequel of Flashback. It was in co-development by Delphine Software International and Adeline Software International for a planned release in 2003. As opposed to Fade to Black, it was going to be a 2D side-scroller game, like Flashback, but without non-scrolling areas. It was targeted exclusively for the Game Boy Advance. The game was cancelled when Delphine went bankrupt and ceased operations in the end of 2002. However, a prototype ROM, dated 21 June 2002, was leaked and spread over the Internet at some point. It features all 16 levels with minor glitches and one music track, which is a compressed tune from Fade to Black. Despite multi-language options the beta can only be played in French with an English pause menu, but can be played in English via a fan-made patch.

References

External links
 
 

1995 video games
Action-adventure games
Cyberpunk video games
Delphine Software International games
DOS games
Dreamcast games
Electronic Arts games
PlayStation (console) games
Science fiction video games
Video games about extraterrestrial life
Video games developed in France
Video game sequels